Claude St John (born 4 February 1951) is a Guyanese cricketer. He played in seven first-class matches for British Guiana from 1968 to 1975.

See also
 List of Guyanese representative cricketers

References

External links
 

1951 births
Living people
Guyanese cricketers
Guyana cricketers